The Asia/Oceania Zone was one of the three zones of the regional Davis Cup competition in 1994.

In the Asia/Oceania Zone there were three different tiers, called groups, in which teams competed against each other to advance to the upper tier.

Group I

Winners in Group I advanced to the World Group Qualifying Round, along with losing teams from the World Group first round. The winner of the preliminary round joined the remaining teams in the main draw first round, while the losing team was relegated to the Asia/Oceania Zone Group II in 1995.

Participating nations

Draw

Group II

Winners in Group II advanced to the Asia/Oceania Zone Group I. Teams who lost their respective ties competed in the relegation play-offs, with winning teams remaining in Group II, whereas teams who lost their play-offs were relegated to the Asia/Oceania Zone Group III in 1995.

Participating nations

Draw

Group III

Winners in Group III advanced to the Asia/Oceania Zone Group II in 1995. All other teams remained in Group III.

 Venue: Khalifa International Tennis and Squash Complex, Doha, Qatar
 Date: 6–10 April

Participating countries

Draw

References

External links
Davis Cup official website

 
Davis Cup Asia/Oceania Zone
Asia Oceania Zone